Forestry Commission may refer to: 

Africa
 Forestry Commission (Ghana)
 Forestry Commission (Zimbabwe), a forestry university in Mutare
 Central African Forest Commission (French: Commission des Forêts d’Afrique Centrale, or COMIFAC), Yaoundé, Cameroon

Americas

United States
 Alabama Forestry Commission
 Georgia Forestry Commission
 New Hampshire Forestry Commission; see Kearsarge North
 New York Fisheries, Game and Forest Commission (1895–1900), predecessor to the New York State Department of Environmental Conservation
 New York Forest Commission (1885–1893), predecessor to the New York State Department of Environmental Conservation 
 New York Forest, Fish and Game Commission (1900–1911), predecessor to the New York State Department of Environmental Conservation

Mexico
 National Forestry Commission of Mexico

Asia
 National Forest Commission (India), established 2003; see Conservation in India

Australasia
 Forestry Commission of Tasmania, Tasmania, Australia; see Richardson v Forestry Commission of Tasmania
 New South Wales Forestry Commission, forest management agency for New South Wales, Australia; see Cumberland State Forest (New South Wales)
 Forests Commission Victoria (1918–1983), Victoria, Australia

Europe
 Forestry Commission, a non-ministerial government department responsible for forestry in England
 Lower Saxon Forestry Commission, Lower Saxony, Germany; see WeltWald Harz

See also 
 List of forestry ministries